USS Goshen (APA-108) was a Bayfield class attack transport in service with the United States Navy from 1944 to 1946. She was sold into commercial service in 1947 and was scrapped in 1973.

History
Goshen, originally Sea Hare, was laid down by Western Pipe & Steel under a Maritime Commission contract on 31 January 1944.  It was launched 29 June, acquired by the Navy 13 December and commissioned the same day.

Pacific War
After shakedown along the California coast, Goshen departed Long Beach 4 February 1945 for additional combat and amphibious training in the Hawaiian Islands. Embarking over 1,400 troops and officers at Honolulu, she departed there for duty in the Western Pacific. Goshen made brief stops at Ulithi and Eniwetok before proceeding to the Okinawa area where the bitter campaign to secure that Japanese-held fortress was already underway.

The transport arrived off Hagushi beaches Okinawa on 17 April and immediately commenced disembarking troops and unloading cargo. Goshen completed her task 5 days later and sailed for Saipan arriving there on the 27th. After loading mail and passengers at Saipan, Russell, Florida, and New Hebrides Islands, she sailed for the United States 18 May, arriving in San Francisco 3 June.

Goshen made another cruise to the Western Pacific in July carrying troops and cargo for the final month of the war. She was at Saipan when news of the Japanese acceptance of surrender terms was received. After the war Goshen operated between the Philippines and Japan for the next 4 months as she shuttled occupation troops and cargo among the Islands.

Operation Magic Carpet
In December the transport joined the growing number of ships engaged in Operation Magic Carpet  - an organized project to bring the war veterans back home immediately. On 10 December she steamed out of Sasebo with over 1,400 America bound Marines, finally arriving San Diego on the 28th.

In late January 1946 Goshen departed the West Coast arriving at Lynnhaven Roads, Virginia on 12 February. She decommissioned at Norfolk 20 April and was delivered to WSA 2 May 1946.

Commercial service
Goshen was sold in 1947 to American Mail Lines Ltd., re-registered in Portland, Oregon, and renamed Canada Mail. In 1963 her name was changed to California Mail. In 1968, she was sold to Waterman Steamship, re-registered in New York, and renamed La Fayette. She remained in service with Waterman Steamship until 1973, when she was taken to Kaohsiung, Taiwan and scrapped in August of that year.

Awards
Goshen received one battle star for World War II service.

References
 
 USS Goshen (APA-108), Navsource Online
 

 

Bayfield-class attack transports
Ships built in San Francisco
1944 ships
World War II amphibious warfare vessels of the United States
Goshen County, Wyoming